Munni Saha is a Bangladeshi journalist and television host who mainly works ATN News. She is the news head of ATN News, a leading news broadcasting of Bangladesh.

Early life and education 
Saha was born in Munshiganj District, Bangladesh in 1969. She studied at Eden Mohila College and obtained her B.Sc. (Honors) in 1998. She completed her MA in mass communication and journalism at Dhaka University in 1994.

Career 
Saha started at the national newspaper Daily Ajker Kagoj as a sub editor on the international desk from May 1991 to January 1992. Afterwards, she worked with the national newspaper Daily Bhorer Kagoj as a staff reporter. She was the Special Correspondent of Ekushey TV in 1999, the Special Correspondent of ATN Bangla in 2003 and the Head of News of ATN News in 2010. She has been the chief executive editor of ATN News since 2016. She mainly covers mainstream social and political issues but also health, women and children issues including child trafficking, violence against women such as acid throwing, rape and other sorts of repression.

References 

1969 births
Living people
Bangladeshi women journalists
Women television executives
Women television editors